The Hedwig and Robert Samuel Foundation is the "Foundation for Education". Its target is to provide occupational qualifications for a broad level of population in less developed countries and to improve the life of the people living there. The foundation's work focuses on children and teenagers. Helping them, is seen as the best way to break the vicious circle of poverty and the absence of a future perspective.

The foundation's activities exist to help them to help themselves. Development should come about from the people themselves, both on a personal and social level. The Samuel Foundation has focused on the area of training. Training offers the most important leverage to personal and social development.

History

The founders - Hedwig and Robert Samuel 

Robert Samuel was born in Düsseldorf on 8 February 1871, the second of four children. Following the early death of his father, he earned his living by importing and selling tobacco products. By the time he was in his early thirties, he had already become so successful that he was appointed purveyor to the court of the King of Württemberg. In 1906, at the age of 35, Robert Samuel purchased the land section at Königsallee 14/Blumenstraße 2 from the City of Düsseldorf. Between 1907 and 1911, he had an office building, the “Hohenzollernhaus”, erected there. He established it as his business address and expanded his operations into retail sales.

In 1920, Robert Samuel married Hedwig Göldner, from Langenberg in the Rhineland, the third of six children. In 1927, he stipulated in his will that a foundation be set up. In doing so, he was following in the tradition of affluent Düsseldorf citizens at the turn of the century who often donated part of their fortune for charitable purposes. An additional motive may have been that the Samuels’ marriage had not produced any children. Robert Samuel died on 22 January 1931, at the age of 61. The foundation was officially approved on 3 June 1932.

Hedwig Samuel was born on 15 June 1893. She had left Düsseldorf after Robert Samuel's death, but returned to settle there again in the early 1950s with her second husband, the physician Theo Olbert. She always kept in close contact with the foundation's Board of Directors, and was always on hand to lend an attentive ear to any problems that arose. She proved a reliable source of help and advice for the board, which during this period exercised a purely administrative role. Hedwig Samuel died on 29 April 1976 at the age of 82, in the city she had made her home.

The Hohenzollernhaus 

At the turn of the twentieth century, Robert Samuel purchased the land section of Königsallee 14/Blumenstraße 2 and commissioned the Düsseldorf architect Hermann vom Endt to build the “Hohenzollernhaus” there. It was built between 1910 and 1911; the name was given to the building presumably in honour of the King of Württemberg, who was a member of the Hohenzollern family.

During the war, the building suffered two direct hits from firebombs, and was badly damaged each time. The roof structure was completely destroyed, and a proper replacement was built only in the early 1980s, with the construction of the present roof extension. Since this time, the “Hohenzollernhaus” functions as the foundation's headquarters and principal source of revenue. This 6-floor-building hosts the Wempe Jeweller, the clothing manufacturer Tom Tailor as well as the office space service company World-Wide Business Centres.

The history of the Samuel Foundation at a glance

June 3, 1932 was the official founding date of the Hedwig and Robert Samuel Foundation. That was the day on which the Prussian Ministry of State approved the foundation charter and constitution, which represented the last formal stage in the process of establishing the organisation.

The first Board of Directors consisted of the executors of the will, three Jewish traders who had been friends of Robert Samuel. In the late 1930s, these three resigned their positions under pressure from the National Socialists. Although the new appointees to the board then complied with the formal demands of the National Socialist authorities, this afforded the foundation only limited protection from the covetousness of the Nazi organisations. In the end, it was probably more due to tactical considerations on the part of competing organisations than anything else that the foundation managed to survive the Nazi period.

When it was established, the foundation received an endowment of an office and commercial building at Königsallee 14 in Düsseldorf. Revenue from this building was paid to the co-founder, Hedwig Samuel, during her lifetime. In 1976, for the first time, the foundation acquired funds to enable it to realise its original objectives. However, the passage of time, and in particular the war years, had left their mark on the building at Königsallee 14 and so priority initially had to be given to maintaining this asset by completely renovating the building. Even during this period, however, the foundation managed to provide financial support for different social welfare projects, most of which were those run by the City of Düsseldorf. Today, the foundation is still active in Düsseldorf as the KiD gGmbH children's facility well illustrates: the Samuel Foundation is its partner.

In 1984, the foundation began to develop its own infrastructure, which paved the way for international aid operations. While sponsorship was initially provided only for external projects, i. e. for those run by other organisations, realisation of the foundation's own projects in developing countries gradually began to assume greater importance. Over a relatively short period of time, the various representative offices of the foundation were set up: in Costa Rica in 1987, Nicaragua in 1989, Nigeria in 1991 and India in 1993. In 1999, the foundation withdrew from project work in Nigeria because of the increasing difficulties of working there. In early 2002, it opened a further representative office in Thailand.

Activities in Germany 

Most of the funds that the Samuel Foundation received from the second half of the 1970s on, in the form of investment income, were initially spent on urgently needed renovation and roof construction work on its own business premises in Königsallee. Accordingly, meeting the objectives of the foundation had to be postponed for a time. However, even during this phase, smaller donations were made to assist social welfare projects, mostly in Düsseldorf. Later, when work on safeguarding the value of the assets had been completed and a separate infrastructure was beginning to develop, the Samuel Foundation was finally in a position to sponsor larger projects as well.

Early on, the foundation established contacts with the Düsseldorf Academy of Art (Kunstakademie Düsseldorf), and assisted art students from low-income families by organising competitions and exhibitions, and awarding individual scholarships. In doing so, the foundation was following in the footsteps of its founder, Robert Samuel, who himself had assisted artists by providing them with studios in the Königsallee building.

When in 1992 the idea to set up an inpatient specialised facility for children who had experienced violence, maltreatment and abuse came about, the Samuel Foundation became actively involved in setting up this facility. Today, the Samuel Foundation, together with two other support organisations, makes up the partners of the KiD gGmbH.

Projects

Costa Rica

In the mid-1980s, the Samuel Foundation began to extend its aid programme for the socially disadvantaged to include international operations. Prompted by the steadily rising levels of poverty in underdeveloped countries around the world, the Samuel Foundation began to focus its efforts more and more on such countries.

Initial donations to organisations engaged in development work, for example to the foundation ‘Menschen für Menschen’ (People for People) or to ‘Friedensdorf International’ (International Peace Village), were followed by direct assistance to people and institutions in developing countries.

From simply providing financial assistance with individual projects, the Samuel Foundation's involvement quickly developed into providing on-the-spot aid. Its main focus was on providing education for children and young people from disadvantaged backgrounds, thus giving them a basis for a worthwhile future.

The Samuel Foundation arrived in Costa Rica in 1987 through personal contacts. Initial small-scale assistance to institutions in San Isidro del General, a local centre in the south-west of the country, were followed in 1989 by the establishment of the Asociación Hedwig y Robert Samuel Costa Rica. It was through this institution in San Isidro that the Samuel Foundation commenced its operations on the ground in Costa Rica. For example, it financed and organised an extension to the Lomas de Cocorí School, which comprised three new classrooms, a kitchen and refectory, and new sanitary facilities. Additionally, it provided a minibus for the local old people's home and an air-conditioning system for the hospital's intensive care unit. In 1991, the Samuel Foundation built two residential homes, each of which could accommodate 10 to 15 children in need of help and protection. The foundation still maintains these two facilities in cooperation with PANI, the child welfare authorities in Costa Rica.

Following its decision to become involved in technical training in Costa Rica as well; the foundation then leased suitable premises in the capital, San José, and in 1996 began training courses there in four specialist areas of refrigeration and air conditioning technology. In 1999, the foundation moved to its own premises near the centre of San José, where it now also runs a service workshop with trainees.

In 2004, the training centre was extended through the construction of a 170 sqm training workshop, which is seamlessly connected to the existing structure. The construction was made possible by donations from the German embassy as well as donations in kind and services provided free of charge by partner companies.

Today, the centre boasts a total capacity of 250 full-time places for vocational training in the area of air conditioning and refrigeration. It is indebted to the numerous co-sponsors who helped to provide the training centre with modern devices, school utensils and tools, which facilitate high-quality training.

Nicaragua

In 1989, the Samuel Foundation commenced operations in Nicaragua. Following the long years of civil war, the level of poverty and want was visible everywhere in this Central American state. In the early stages, therefore, the foundation provided general aid, such as providing mosquito nets for children's homes in Managua, buying medicine and medical equipment for a health centre near Granada, and providing financial support for child day-care centres.

The end of the civil war in 1990 meant that many young people in particular were left living on the streets, because they had learnt no profession other than how to wage war. The task of integrating this group of people into society was an enormous responsibility and one that the government was unable to shoulder, since it was already heavily in debt from high military spending. The final decision by the Samuel Foundation to involve itself in vocational training for manual professions had the goal of creating a viable future for these young people.
In 1992/93, therefore, the foundation set up a training centre in Managua, which began by offering technical training for car mechanics. It did not take long until further training courses including civil construction, administration and office communication as well as courses for commercial clerks for tourism and the hotel sector, were added. At the same time, the training centre was gradually extended. Today, the training centre covers a three-hectare area with eight classrooms, two computer training rooms as well as three training workshops. The latest extension was finished in 2006 with support given from the Japanese Embassy. Adjoining buildings, such as the canteen, administration building and the sports complex complete the training centre. The training centre offers places for 300 full-time students.      
 
In addition to its activities in the training centre, the foundation runs two projects in cooperation with the Federal Ministry for Economic Cooperation: with the first project, the foundation focuses on coordinating the supply of water in the communities of San Ignacio, El Guanacaste und La Fuente. With the second project, the Samuel Foundation was able to help extend the Bello Amanecer elementary school.

The Samuel Foundation still regularly supports the El Tepeyac medical facility near Granada with donations in kind and funding. The medical facility is run by catholic nuns and represents the only help for miles around for the ill and frail in this rural and difficult to access region.

India

The Samuel Foundation began its work in India in 1991, following a donation of DM 500,000 from an Indian businessman. Once bureaucratic obstacles had been surmounted, the Samuel Foundation Charitable India Trust, based in New Delhi, was set up in 1993, and training courses were commenced that same year. Until the trust was officially recognised in 1995, the foundation was obliged to work together with the ‘Coordination Committee for Leprosy Welfare’, an association providing help to leprosy sufferers, and to operate the training facility jointly with them. The benefit the 'Coordination Committee for Leprosy Welfare' offered was the fact that it could receive funds from overseas, thus securing the flow of money from the Samuel Foundation at that time. In return, the Samuel Foundation supported the association in the extension of the school at the leper colony. 
  
Since achieving independent, the city of New Delhi has provided the foundation with rent-free premises for its vocational training operation. From the very beginning, the focus of the training was in the textile area. Today, the Samuel Foundation trains approximately 100 young men and women in tailoring and fashion design at the training centres in Tagore Garden and Garhi.

Thailand

Since early 2002, the Samuel Foundation has also been active in Thailand and has been officially recognised as an international development organisation since 2006.
Following an initiative by Gerd Mathia, a former Düsseldorf marketing and product consultant who has lived in Thailand for many years, the foundation now provides care and support in the education of children of school age.

The Samuel Foundation is located in the province of Lampang, a remote agricultural region in Northern Thailand. As this region is very poor, there is a lack of even the most basic resources. This is the reason why the foundation decided to give the children and young people in its care the opportunity to attend school in order to provide them with the most important requirements for a career. The school education in Thailand is free of charge, however, transport, school utensils and uniforms are not. Without the support of the Samuel Foundation, most of the children in the care of the Samuel Foundation would not be able to attend elementary school, let alone a secondary school. Apart from funding the school attendance, the foundation also offers its protégés additional computer and English lessons as well as after-school childcare.

Moreover, the foundation continuously supports school facilities in the region. For example, with the support of the Schmitz-Hille Foundation and the Ruamjai association, the Samuel Foundation renovated the kitchens at the Ban Giu and the Pong Nam Rin schools in 2005. Since then, 120 pupils are served their daily meal. The Samuel Foundation covers 80% of the costs, the remainder is provided by the state.

Focus on training 

Training programme

Costa Rica
 Car mechatronics
 Industrial refrigeration
 Refrigeration in transport
 Industrial air conditioning

Nicaragua
 Car mechatronics
 Civil construction
 Administration and office communication
 Commercial clerks for tourism

India
 Dress designing

Thailand
 general school education

The range of courses open for the scholarship holder includes day courses which last a maximum of 21 months. Apart from this, also evening courses are offered for those who are already employed and weekend courses for special advanced training courses. The training courses normally consist of an introductory phase of about 2 months, professional training which takes from 6 to 12 months and a practical phase from 2 to 3 months. Working under real-life conditions as well as the practical preparation of the students is the top priority in all training courses. They are designed in such a way that the young people are involved in a two to three month practical training phase in the factories of partner companies, during which they get to know the typical production and working processes. Moreover, one hopes that with such practical training, these adolescents are taken on by the employer once they have graduated.

All students receive English lessons as well as computer training. An important part of the lessons is also "personnel development" that strives to deal with the results of this past and prepare the young people for the future. In one part of the personnel training, the students are involved in some form of social work. This could be activities around the training centre itself as well as helping the foundation at its other facilities. In this way the students get an understanding of social values. At the same time, one deals with the problems which led to the young people needing help. It is only in this way that one can give them something back through their training, which, in turn, strengthens their self-respect.

Success 

Up to now over 3,900 young people have taken part successfully in the foundation's training programmes. Up to 90% of its students have found work in their area of specialization within the first three months of completing the course.

Sources 
Website of the Samuel Foundation

Educational foundations
Foundations based in Germany
International educational organizations
Training organizations
Organisations based in Düsseldorf